Taingda Mingyi U Pho (– 31 May 1896) was a Burmese official of the royal courts of King Mindon and King Thibaw during the Konbaung dynasty. He became the most powerful official at King Thibaw's court and held several key positions, including Minister of the Interior, Minister of Defense, and Senior Minister of the Hluttaw. Taingda was seen as an opponent of Kinwun Mingyi U Kaung and the leader of the conservative faction that advocated for war with the British.

Life
Maung Pho was born into minor nobility who served in the newly conquered kingdom of Arakan during the reign of King Bodawpaya. His father, Maha Mingyi Kyawswa, was governor of Sandoway (Thandwe). His date of birth is not known.

When King Mindon died in 1878, U Pho felt powerful enough to offer the throne to the late king's son, Prince Thibaw. He played a major role in the massacre of around forty members of the Burmese royal family. He was an ally of Queen Hsinbyumashin, who ordered almost all possible heirs to the throne to be killed, so that her daughter Supayalat and son-in-law Thibaw Min would become queen and king. "Minister of the Royal Daughter").

Right after the Third Anglo-Burmese War, Taingda briefly served in the incoming British administration. He and Kinwun were the first two Burmese to be appointed to the Legislative Council of Burma. However, the British soon detained Taingda, charging him with creating unrest in the country, and exiled him to Cuttack, Odisha State, India. In 1890, the British sent him back to Burma.

He died on 31 May 1896 (Sunday, 6th waning of Nayon 1258 ME) in Rangoon (Yangon).

References

Bibliography
 

Government ministers of Myanmar
People from Mandalay
Burmese Theravada Buddhists
Konbaung dynasty
People from Mandalay Region
1820s births
1896 deaths
Members of the Legislative Council of Burma